The French Indoor Athletics Championships is an annual indoor track and field competition organised by the Fédération française d'athlétisme (FFA), which serves as the French national championship for the sport. Typically held over two to three days in February during the French winter, it was first added to the national calendar in 1972, supplementing the main outdoor French Athletics Championships held in the summer since 1888.

Events
The following athletics events feature as standard on the French Indoor Championships programme:

 Sprint: 60 m, 200 m, 400 m
 Distance track events: 800 m, 1500 m, 3000 m
 Hurdles: 60 m hurdles
 Jumps: long jump, triple jump, high jump, pole vault
 Throws: shot put
 Racewalking: 5000 m (men), 3000 m (women)
 Combined events: heptathlon (men), pentathlon (women)

Editions

Championship records

Men

Women

References

External links
FFA official website
French Athletics Championships documentation
FFA: French Indoor Championships Records – Men
FFA: Indoor Championships Records – Women

 
Athletics competitions in France
National indoor athletics competitions
Recurring sporting events established in 1972
1972 establishments in France
February sporting events